Bon Accord Football Club were a football team from Aberdeen, Scotland who suffered the worst defeat in any Scottish senior football match, losing 36–0 to Arbroath on 12 September 1885 in a first round match of the Scottish Cup. Thirteen goals were scored by centre-forward John Petrie, a Scottish Cup and joint world record. The Bon Accord goal keeper was Andrew Lornie.

Game v Arbroath in the Scottish Cup 

Arbroath were 15–0 up by half time, and scored another 21 goals in the second half. The Scottish Athletic Journal at the time wrote "The leather was landed between the posts 41 times, but five of the times were disallowed. Here and there, enthusiasts would be seen scoring sheet and pencil in hand, taking note of the goals as one would score runs at a cricket match."''

Later history 

Bon Accord were founder members of the Aberdeenshire and District Football Association.  The club played in the Aberdeenshire Cup from 1889 to 1892, its best performance being winning through two rounds (including a 10-0 away win at Aberdeen Harp) before losing to Aberdeen, this Aberdeen in time merging with Orion F.C. & Victoria United to form Aberdeen.

The club entered the Scottish Cup in 1891-92.  In the 1st round (5 September 1891), they defeated Stonehaven away 9–0, with goals from Forsyth (3), Hay (2), Clark (3), and Macfarlane,  but then lost 5–2 at home the original Aberdeen in the 2nd round (26 September 1891).

Colours
The club's original colours were red and white striped shirts (in the context of the time, probably hoops) and white shorts.  There is a reference to them wearing plain white shirts for the tie with Arbroath, taken from their cricket whites, but this is probably apocryphal and based on the erroneous belief that Bon Accord was a re-named Orion Cricket Club.  

From 1890 to 1892 the club wore dark blue.

Bon Accord Juniors
A second Bon Accord club was founded as a junior outfit in 1892, after the demise of the original, and played until 1906.

In the 1980s, Bon Accord re-emerged in the North East Junior leagues, courtesy of the largesse of Bryan Keith – the former head joiner of Fyvie Castle and founder of the Bon Accord Glass company – as part of his own Bon Accord Sports Club.

Moving the side from their Findon Park ground in the fishing village of Findon (which was taken over by their former derby rivals Parkvale – who had given up on trying to win a following in Aberdeen dominated by Banks O'Dee, Aberdeen East End and Sunnybank), Bon Accord thereafter played at the custom-built Keith Park in the Hillhead, Bridge of Don area of Aberdeen, and played in blue-and-white halved tops, blue shorts and socks.

However, when Bryan Keith left the club to become chairman of Montrose, Keith Park and the Bon Accord Sports Club was bought by the University of Aberdeen, who eventually renamed Keith Park as the Hillhead Sports Centre. By the summer of 1997, Bon Accord F.C. were no more.

After 17 years in amateur football, Aberdeenshire amateur side, Wilson's XI (named after founder Norman Wilson), returned Keith Park to junior football when they joined the grade in 2000, rebranding themselves Hillhead Juniors in 2006.

A Bon Accord City AFC, made up of Bon Accord Juniors and Wilson's XI members who opposed the takeover and renaming, currently play in the Aberdeenshire Amateur leagues, playing at Aberdeen University's Balgownie Playing Fields, the former playing fields of Wilson's XI.

References

Football clubs in Aberdeen
Defunct football clubs in Scotland
1997 disestablishments in Scotland
Association football clubs disestablished in 1997
Kincardineshire